Armand Maillard, born 18 June 1943 in Offroicourt (Vosges), is the recent French Catholic church archbishop, of the diocese of Bourges.

He was appointed to that position by Pope Benedict XVI on 11 September 2007, succeeding Archbishop Hubert Barbier. The new archbishop, who also received the honorary title of patriarch and primate of Aquitaine, was greeted in his cathedral on 14 October and took his seat in the presence of the bishops of the province: Archbishops Bernard-Nicolas Aubertin, Metropolitan Archbishop of Tours; André Fort, bishop of Orleans; Michel Pansard, Bishop of Chartres; Maurice de Germiny, Bishop of Blois.

Career
He completed theological studies at the Strasbourg Faculty of Catholic Theology from 1967 to 1971. He holds two licenses, the first in letters (in German) and the second in theology. He was ordained a priest on 28 June 1970.

He was assigned responsibility in 1976 throughout the diocese for catechesis, and was named head of the permanent diaconate. He continued to also be a chaplain in high schools. From 1987 to 1996 he was secretary of the Apostolic East region.

He was named Bishop of Laval by Pope John Paul II on 2 August 1996, and consecrated by the Archbishop of Aix, Louis-Marie Billé, on 5 October.

He was archbishop of Bourges from 2007 until July 2018. In this role he helped the Little Sisters Disciples of the Lamb obtain the definitive recognition of their statutes in 2011.

Within the Bishops' Conference of France, he was a member of the Commission of ordained ministries. He is currently bishop accompanying the national service of vocations and a member of the Council for the Pastoral Care of children and young people, responsibility for Catholic Education.
in 2011 he gave the abbatial blessing to Jean Pateau as abbot of Fontgombault Abbey.

See also
 Catholic Church in France
 List of the Roman Catholic dioceses of France

References

1943 births
Living people
Archbishops of Bourges
People from Vosges (department)
21st-century Roman Catholic archbishops in France
Chevaliers of the Légion d'honneur